Blessing Moyo (born 4 April 1995) is a Zimbabwean football defender who currently plays for Real Kings.

References

1995 births
Living people
Zimbabwean footballers
Dynamos F.C. players
Harare City F.C. players
Maritzburg United F.C. players
Real Kings F.C. players
Zimbabwe international footballers
Association football defenders
Zimbabwean expatriate footballers
Expatriate soccer players in South Africa
Zimbabwean expatriate sportspeople in South Africa
South African Premier Division players
National First Division players
Zimbabwe Premier Soccer League players
Zimbabwe A' international footballers
2016 African Nations Championship players